Lavender Mountain is a summit in the U.S. state of Georgia.

Lavender Mountain was named after George Michael Lavender, a local merchant.

References

Mountains of Floyd County, Georgia
Mountains of Georgia (U.S. state)